Jean-Claude Izzo (Marseille 20 June 1945 – Marseille 26 January 2000) was a French poet, playwright, screenwriter, and novelist who achieved sudden fame in the mid-1990s with the publication of his three neo-noir crime novels Total Chaos, Chourmo, and Solea (widely known as the Marseilles Trilogy), featuring as protagonist ex-cop Fabio Montale, and set in the author's native city of Marseille. All have been translated into English by Howard Curtis.

Jean-Claude Izzo was born on 20 June 1945 in Marseille, France. His father was an Italian immigrant from Castel San Giorgio (Province of Salerno) and his maternal grandfather was a Spanish immigrant. He excelled in school and spent much of his time at his desk writing stories and poems. But because of his "immigrant" status, he was forced into a technical school where he was taught how to operate a lathe.

In 1963, he began work in a bookstore. He also actively campaigned on behalf of Pax Christi, a Catholic peace movement. In 1964, he was called up for military duty in Toulon and Djibouti. He worked for the military newspaper as a photographer and journalist.

Bibliography 

Poèmes à haute voix (P.J. Oswald, 1970)
Terres de feu (P.J. Oswald, 1972)
État de veille (P.J. Oswald, 1974)
Braises, brasiers, brûlures (poesie illustrate da E. Damofli, 1975)
Paysage de femme (Guy Chambelland, 1975)
Le réel au plus vif (Guy Chambelland, 1976)
Clovis Hughes, un rouge du Midi (J. Laffitte, 1978)
Total Kheops (Gallimard, Série Noire, 1995). Italian translation Casino totale (Editions and/or, 1998). German translation Total Cheops (Unionsverlag, 2000). English translation Total Chaos (New York: Europa Editions, 2005). Polish translation Total khéops (Warszawa: W.A.B., 2005) Irish Translation Kíor Tuathail (Contae na Gaillimhe:Leabhair Breac, 2017).
Chourmo (Gallimard, Série Noire, 1996). Italian translation Chourmo. Il cuore di Marsiglia (Editions and/or, 1999). German translation Chourmo (Unionsverlag, 2000). English translation Chourmo (New York: Europa Editions, 2006). Polish translation Szurmo (Warszawa: W.A.B., 2006)
Loin de tous rivages (Ed. du Ricochet, 1997) 
Les marins perdus (Flammarion, 1997). Italian translation Marinai perduti (Editions and/or, 2001). German translation Aldebaran (Unionsverlag, 2002). English translation The Lost Sailors (New York: Europa Editions, 2007). Dutch translation Eindpunt Marseille (Breda: De Geus, 2007). Spanish translation Los marineros perdidos (Editorial Montesinos, 2010)
Vivre fatigue (Librio, 1998). Italian translation Vivere stanca (Editions and/or, 2001). German edition Leben macht müde (Unionsverlag, 2005) 
Soléa (Gallimard, Série Noire, 1998). Italian translation Solea (Editions and/or, 2000). German translation Solea (Unionsverlag, 2001). English translation Solea (New York: Europa Editions, 2007). Polish translation Solea (Warszawa: W.A.B., 2007) 
L'Aride des jours (Ed. du Ricochet, 1999)
Le soleil des mourants (Flammarion, 1999). Italian translation Il sole dei morenti (Editions and/or, 2000). German edition Die Sonne der Sterbenden (Unionsverlag, 2003). English translation A Sun for the Dying (New York: Europa Editions, 2008)
Un temps immobile (Filigrane Editions, 1999)
La Méditerranée en fragments (Maison méditerranéenne des sciences de l'homme, 2000). Italian translation Frammenti di Mediterraneo story in Rappresentare il Mediterraneo. Lo sguardo francese (Mesogea, 2000)
Marseille (Hoëbeke, 2000). German editions Izzo's Marseille (Unionsverlag, 2003) and Mein Marseille (Unionsverlag, 2010). Italian translation Aglio, menta e basilico (Editions and/or, 2006). English edition Garlic, Mint and Sweet Basil: Essays on Marseilles, Mediterranean Cuisine, and Noir Fiction (Europa Editions, 2013)

Awards 
  for Chourmo.
 2001: Deutscher Krimi Preis in the category of International (1. Platz) for Chourmo.

Filmography as an author or screenwriter 
Les matins chagrins, directed by Jean-Pierre Gallepe (1990)
Fabio Montale, series of three TV movies, directed by José Pinheiro (2001). The adaptation was controversial for Alain Delon in the lead since his politics and personality are the opposite of Izzo's.
Roger et Fred, TV movie (2001).
Total Kheops, directed by Alain Bévérini (2002)
Les marins perdus, directed by Claire Devers (2003)

See also
Mediterranean noir

References

External links
Guardian Books blog

1945 births
2000 deaths
Writers from Marseille
French people of Italian descent
People of Campanian descent
French people of Spanish descent
French male screenwriters
20th-century French screenwriters
French crime fiction writers
Writers from Provence-Alpes-Côte d'Azur
20th-century French novelists
French male novelists
20th-century French male writers